Christ Junior College (CJC) is a pre-university college located in Bangalore, Karnataka, India. The institution was under the purview of Christ College and was formed in the academic year 2002-03 as a result of the bifurcation of the Degree and Pre-University courses. CJC functions from a single and separate building located in the Christ University campus.

History 
CJC was started in 1969 under the name of Christ College. Christ College initially offered Pre-University and undergraduate courses to its students. Over the past 40 years, it has increased its academic programmes to include postgraduate and diploma programmes. It established itself as a separate institution in 2002 following the bifurcation of the Pre-University course from the other academic programmes offered by the then Christ College.

Admissions 
Admissions to CJC are extremely competitive and are based on the marks obtained by a student in the Class X board examinations held across India. Cut-off percentages for admission to I PUC in CJC are generally the highest amongst the various Bangalore city colleges offering Pre-University courses.

Academics

Departments 
CJC has a number of specialised academic departments which cater to students studying in the different streams offered by the college. The college has nine such departments:
 The Department of English
 The Department of Languages
 The Department of Physics
 The Department of Chemistry
 The Department of Mathematics
 The Department of Biology
 The Department of Electronics
 The Department of Commerce
 The Department of Social Sciences

Academic programmes 
CJC offers PU degree combinations in science, commerce and social sciences. English is a compulsory first language and there are four optional second languages namely, Kannada, Sanskrit, Hindi and French. The following are the stream-wise core subject combinations offered by CJC:

Science 
 PCMB (Physics, Chemistry, Mathematics, Biology)
 PCME (Physics, Chemistry, Mathematics, Electronics)
 PCMC (Physics, Chemistry, Mathematics, Computer science)

Commerce 
 CAMS (Commerce [Business Studies], Accountancy, Basic Mathematics, Statistics)
 CAME (Commerce [Business Studies], Accountancy, Basic Mathematics, Economics)

Social Sciences 
 HEPP (History, Economics, Political Science, Psychology)
 HESP (History, Economics, Sociology, Political Science)
 PPES (Psychology, Political Science, Economics, Sociology)
CJC also provides its students with a learning management system (LMS), an internet-based e-learning tool, to facilitate learning and sharing of information outside the classroom.

Student life 
CJC has a very vibrant and dynamic student culture. Apart from academics, the college encourages students to actively engage in a whole host of co-curricular and extra-curricular activities in order to facilitate their holistic development.

Associations and Clubs 
CJC offers the opportunity for its students to engage and participate in the various clubs that are considered a vital part of its educational programme. The following are the clubs currently present in the college:
 The Student Welfare Office (SWO)
 The Model United Nations Society (MUNSOC)
 The Science Forum
 Social Sciences Association (SPECTRUM)
 The Commerce Association (COLOSSUS)
 The Association of Christian Christities (ACC)
 Eco-Club (PRAKRUTHI)
 Language Association (PRERANA)
 The English Literary Club (PIERIAN SPRING)
 The Quiz Club (SEDES MINERVA)
 The College Brass Band
 The College Choir
 The National Cadet Corps (NCC)
 Centre for Social Action (CSA)
 Campus Sports
 Tech Club

CJC-MUN 
CJC organized the first edition of the CJCMUN in 2008. It went inter-school in 2010. In 2011, the college participated in the India edition of the Harvard Model United Nations(HMUN India) organized by the Harvard International Relations Council and received a number of awards. The CJCMUN has since gone on to become one of the most popular MUNs in the city of Bangalore.

In 2022, the college won the best large delegation award at Harvard Model United Nations India will also host the 15th edition of CJC MUN on the 3rd,4th and 5th of November 2022.

International Exchange Programmes 
CJC organises international student exchange programmes with educational institutions in Sweden, Germany and Singapore.

See also
Christ University
Christ School

References

External links

http://www.minglebox.com/college/Christ-Junior-College-Bangalore
https://www.cjcmun.com/

Pre University colleges in Karnataka
Catholic universities and colleges in India
Educational institutions established in 2002
2002 establishments in Karnataka
Colleges in Bangalore